Larry or Lawrence Collins may refer to:
 Larry Collins (American football) (born 1955), American football player
 Larry Collins (writer) (1929–2005), author of several historical books, mainly in collaboration with Dominique Lapierre
 Larry Collins (musician), member of The Collins Kids, a juvenile rockabilly duo
 Lorence G. Collins (born 1931), American petrologist
 Lawrence Collins, Baron Collins of Mapesbury (born 1941), British judge and former Justice of the Supreme Court of the United Kingdom